Johanna Langefeld (5 March 1900, Kupferdreh, Germany – 26 January 1974) was a German female guard and supervisor at three Nazi concentration camps: Lichtenburg, Ravensbrück, and Auschwitz.

Early life

Born in Kupferdreh (now Essen, Germany), Johanna Langefeld was brought up in a Lutheran, nationalistic family. Her father was a blacksmith. In 1924, she moved to Mülheim and married Wilhelm Langefeld, who died in 1926 of lung disease. In 1928, Langefeld fell pregnant with another man, left him soon afterward, and moved to Düsseldorf, where her son was born that August.

Langefeld was unemployed until age 34, when she began to teach domestic economy in an establishment of the city of Neuss. From 1935 onwards, she worked as a guard in a so-called Arbeitsanstalt (working institution) in Brauweiler, which was, in fact, a prison for prostitutes, unemployed and homeless women, and other so called "antisocial" women, who were then later imprisoned in concentration camps. From 1937 on, Langefeld was a member of the Nazi party...

Camp work

In March 1938, Langefeld applied for a job as a camp guard in the first Schutzstaffel (SS) concentration camp for women in Lichtenburg. After one year, she became the female superintendent of this camp, where she stayed until the camp population was transferred to Ravensbrück in May 1939. She was in charge of the selections in Ravensbrück during the so-called "14f13” murder campaign. In March 1942, Langefeld was assigned to build a new women's camp in Auschwitz. There, she selected prisoners for the gas chamber. 

Rudolf Höss, the Commandant of the Auschwitz concentration camp, recalled his contact with Johanna Langefeld as follows:The chief female supervisor of the period, Frau Langefeld, was in no way capable of coping with the situation, yet she refused to accept any instructions given her by the leader of the protective custody camp. Acting on my own initiative, I simply put the women's camp under his jurisdiction.

During the visit of Heinrich Himmler on 18 July 1942, Langefeld tried to get him to annul this order. In fact, Rudolf Höss admitted after the war that “the Reichsführer SS absolutely refused” his order and that he wished “a women's camp to be commanded by a woman”. Himmler ordered that Langefeld should stay in charge of the women's camp and that in the future, no SS man should enter the female camp. 

That month, the Auschwitz women's camp was moved to Auschwitz-Birkenau camp three km away. Two weeks later, Langefeld sustained an injury of her meniscus and required a cartilage operation in the Hohenlychen SS Sanatorium near Ravensbrück. During her stay there, she went to see  Oswald Pohl, the chief of the SS Main Economic and Administrative Office, in Berlin-Lichterfelde, and convinced him to transfer her back to Ravensbrück. 

Maria Mandl became the new Oberaufseherin of the women's prisoner camp in Auschwitz. Oswald Pohl instructed the Chief of Department D of his SS Main Economic and Administrative Office, Richard Glücks, to order that duties of protective custody camp leaders in the Women's Camps be executed thereafter by the female superintendents, the Oberaufseherinnen. 

Margarete Buber-Neumann, who became Langefeld's prisoner assistant in Ravensbrück, recorded that Langefeld was dismissed for excessive sympathy with Polish prisoners; she was separated from her son, taken under arrest to Breslau, where an SS tribunal prepared a trial against her. Langefeld never went to trial, and was released from her camp duties. She then moved to Munich and started to work for BMW.

Arrest and death
On 20 December 1945, Langefeld was arrested by the U.S. Army, and in September 1946, was extradited to the Polish judiciary preparing a trial in Kraków against SS personnel in Auschwitz. On 23 December 1946, she escaped from prison. Given her prior relatively positive treatment of inmates in this German Nazi concentration camp located on occupied Polish soil, the escape was assisted by Polish staff of the prison where she was held. After the escape she hid in a convent, working in a private home. Sometime around 1957, she returned illegally to live with her sister in Munich. She died in Augsburg, Germany on 26 January 1974, aged 73.

Further reading
Johannes Schwartz, Das Selbstverständnis Johanna Langefelds als SS-Oberaufseherin, in: Ulrich Fritz, Silvija Kavčič, Nicole Warmbold (ed.): Tatort KZ, Neue Beiträge zur Geschichte der Konzentrationslager, Ulm 2003, pp. 71–95.
Johannes Schwartz, Geschlechterspezifischer Eigensinn von NS-Täterinnen am Beispiel der KZ-Oberaufseherin Johanna Langefeld, in: Viola Schubert-Lehnhardt (ed.),Frauen als Täterinnen im Nationalsozialismus, Protokollband der Fachtagung vom 17.-18. September 2004 in Bernburg, im Auftrag des Kultur- und Bildungsvereins Elbe-Saale e.V. in Sachsen-Anhalt, Gerbstadt 2005, pp. 56–82, .
Johannes Schwartz, Handlungsoptionen von KZ-Aufseherinnen. Drei alltags- und geschlechtergeschichtliche Fallstudien, in: Helgard Kramer (ed.), NS-Täter aus interdisziplinärer Perspektive, Martin Meidenbauer Verlag, München 2006, S. 349-374.

References

1900 births
1974 deaths
Auschwitz concentration camp personnel
Ravensbrück concentration camp personnel
German escapees
Escapees from Polish detention
People extradited to Poland
Female guards in Nazi concentration camps
Prisoners and detainees of the United States military